
Karl Böttcher (25 October 1889 – 21 October 1973) was a German general in the Wehrmacht during World War II who commanded several divisions. He was a recipient of the Knight's Cross of the Iron Cross.

Böttcher served in the Deutsches Afrikakorps under Erwin Rommel where he commanded an artillery regiment. Later Böttcher was made commander of the 21st Panzer Division. Böttcher surrendered to the Western Allies in 1945 and was interned until 1947.

Awards and decorations
 Iron Cross (1914) 2nd Class (November 1914) & 1st Class (July 1916)
 Frederickscross (27 January 1916)
 Honour Cross of the World War 1914/1918 (1 January 1935)
 Wehrmacht Long Service Award 1st Class (2 October 1936)
 Memel Medal (10 December 1939)
 Clasp to the Iron Cross (1939) 2nd Class (5 June 1940) & 1st Class (15 November 1940)
 Knight's Cross of the Iron Cross on 13 December 1941 as generalmajor and commander of 21st Panzer Division
 Italian Military Order of Savoy (14 January 1942)

References

Citations

Bibliography

 
 

1889 births
1974 deaths
People from Toruń
People from West Prussia
Lieutenant generals of the German Army (Wehrmacht)
German Army personnel of World War I
Prussian Army personnel
Recipients of the Knight's Cross of the Iron Cross
German prisoners of war in World War II
Reichswehr personnel
Officers of the Military Order of Savoy